Delgado is a Spanish and Portuguese surname. Notable people with the surname include:

 Adrián Delgado, Venezuelan actor
 Agustín Delgado (born 1974), Ecuadorian footballer
 Aidan Delgado, American conscientious objector and anti-war activist
 Alberto Delgado Pérez, Cuban footballer
 Alberto Delgado (jockey), American jockey
 Alex Delgado, Venezuelan baseball player
 Álvaro Delgado, Mexican journalist
 Ángel Delgado (born 1994), Dominican Republic basketball player
 Anita Delgado, Spanish flamenco dancer
 Antonio Delgado, New York politician
 Ayax Delgado, Nicaraguan student activist
 Camilo Delgado, Puerto Rican television host
 Campo Elías Delgado Morales (1934-1986), Colombian spree killer
 Carlos Delgado (born 1972), Puerto Rican baseball player 
 Carmenza Delgado, Colombian weightlifter
 César Delgado (born 1981), Argentine footballer
 Chiquinquirá Delgado (born 1972), Venezuelan actress
 Clarence Delgado (born 2004), Filipino teen actor
 Darío Delgado (disambiguation), multiple people
 Delgado (footballer), Portuguese footballer, full name José Manuel Mota Delgado
 Dimas Delgado, Spanish footballer
 Emilio Delgado (1940–2022), Mexican-American actor
 Fernando Eduardo Delgado, Venezuelan composer
 Francisco Afan Delgado, Philippine lawyer and politician
 Frank Delgado (disambiguation), multiple people
 Gabi Delgado-López, Spanish/German industrial musician
 Humberto Delgado, Portuguese general
 Isaac Delgado, New Orleans philanthropist
 Issac Delgado (born 1962), Cuban musician
 James P. Delgado, Canadian maritime archaeologist
 Jamie Delgado, British tennis player
 José Raúl Delgado, Cuban baseball player
 Junior Delgado, Jamaican reggae star
 Lauro Delgado, Filipino actor
 Lorena Delgado Varas (born 1974), Swedish politician
 Lota Delgado, Filipina actress
 Luis Delgado (disambiguation), multiple people
 Luís Delgado, Angolan footballer
 Marcel Delgado, Mexican sculptor
 Marcelo Delgado,  Argentine footballer
 Martin Teofilo Delgado, Philippine revolutionary
 Matías Emilio Delgado (born 1982), Argentine footballer
 Nieves Delgado (born 1968), Spanish writer
 Noémia Delgado, Portuguese television and film screenwriter, film editor and director
 Paco Delgado, Spanish costume designer 
 Patricia Delgado, American ballet dancer
 Pedro Delgado (born 1960), Spanish cyclist
 Ramón Delgado (born 1976), Paraguayan tennis player
 Rebeca Delgado (born 1966), Bolivian politician
 Rebekah Delgado, British singer-songwriter
 Rey Delgado Filipino Handsome moreno from Samar province Politician, Lawyer, Prosecutor and NAPOLCOM Summary Hearing Officer
 Richard Delgado (born 1939), American lawyer, legal educator and writer
 Ricardo Delgado (comics), Costa Rican comic book and animation artist
 Roger Delgado, British actor
 Silviano Delgado, Mexican footballer 
 Trixi Delgado, German singer
 William Delgado (born 1956), American politician

Maternal family name
 José Miguel Arroyo Delgado, Spanish bullfighter
 Estuardo Díaz Delgado, Peruvian mayor
 Campo Elías Delgado, Colombian murderer
 José Ramos Delgado (1935–2010), Argentine footballer and manager
 José Manuel Rodriguez Delgado (1915–2011), Spanish scientist

Fictional characters
 Boman Delgado, fictional character from Rival Schools
 Danny Delgado, fictional character from Power Rangers Wild Force
 Elizabeth "Z" Delgado, fictional character from Power Rangers S.P.D.
 Hoss Delgado, fictional character from The Grim Adventures of Billy & Mandy
 Leo Delgado, fictional character from Inversion
 Marco Delgado (comics), a character from Marvel Comics
 Rico Delgado, fictional character from  Hitman
 Susan Delgado (fictional character), character from The Dark Tower
 Yamato Delgado, character in Battle B-Daman anime

Spanish-language surnames
Portuguese-language surnames
Surnames from nicknames